This is a list of members of the Australian Senate from 1996 to 1999. Half of the state senators had been elected at the March 1993 election and had terms due to finish on 30 June 1999; the other half of the state senators were elected at the March 1996 election and had terms due to finish on 30 June 2002. The territory senators were elected at the March 1996 election and their terms ended at the next federal election, which was October 1998.

Notes

References

Members of Australian parliaments by term
20th-century Australian politicians
Australian Senate lists